Kachua Upazila may refer to:

Kachua Upazila, Bagerhat
Kachua Upazila, Chandpur